Costantino "Tino" Conti (born 26 September 1945) is a retired Italian road cyclist who competed in the individual road race at the 1968 Summer Olympics. After that he turned professional and won a bronze medal at the 1976 World Championships. He also rode the Tour de France in 1970 and 1971 and finished within the podium at several major races.

Major results

1967
Gold of the Mediterranean Games in cycling
1st stage part a Tour de l'Avenir
2nd overall Tour de l'Avenir

1970
2nd overall Coppa Agostoni
3rd overall Grand Prix of Monaco
3rd overall Trofeo Matteotti

1971
2nd overall Tre Valli Varesine

1972
Gran Premio Industria e Commercio di Prato

1974
4th overall Giro d'Italia
Tre Valli Varesine
2nd overall Gran Premio Industria e Commercio di Prato
2nd overall Giro del Veneto
2nd overall Giro del Piemonte
3rd overall Giro di Lombardia
3rd overall Giro della Provincia di Reggio Calabria
3rd overall Gran Premio Industria Belmonte Piceno
3rd overall Giro dell'Emilia

1975
8th overall Giro d'Italia
Giro di Toscana
Gran Premio Industria e Commercio di Prato
3rd stage Giro di Puglia
3rd overall Italian National Road Race Championships
3rd overall Giro della Provincia di Reggio Calabria
3rd overall Trofeo Pantalica
3rd overall Giro di Campania
3rd overall Trofeo Matteotti
3rd overall Giro di Puglia
4th overall Milan–San Remo

1976
3rd of the World Road Championships
9th overall Giro di Lombardia

1977
Giro della Provincia di Reggio Calabria

Results on the major tours

Tour de France
1970: DNF
1971: DNF

Giro d'Italia
1973: 51st
1974: 4th
1975: 8th

References

1945 births
Living people
Italian male cyclists
Olympic cyclists of Italy
Cyclists at the 1968 Summer Olympics
Mediterranean Games medalists in cycling
Mediterranean Games gold medalists for Italy
Competitors at the 1967 Mediterranean Games
Cyclists from the Province of Lecco